Simiganj is a village and jamoat in Tajikistan. It is part of the city of Vahdat in Districts of Republican Subordination. The jamoat has a total population of 35,473 (2015). The river Simiganj flows through the town.

References

Populated places in Districts of Republican Subordination